James Wetzel is Chair of Saint Augustine, Professor of Philosophy, and Director of the Augustinian Institute at Villanova University. He obtained his doctorate from Columbia University.

Works

References

Living people
Villanova University faculty
Augustine scholars
Year of birth missing (living people)
American theologians
Columbia University alumni